Amyema tridactyla is a species of mistletoe in the family Loranthaceae native to the Northern Territory, first described by Bryan Alwyn Barlow in 1983.

References

tridactyla
Flora of the Northern Territory
Parasitic plants
Epiphytes
Taxa named by Bryan Alwyn Barlow
Plants described in 1983